Pratap Pur Chhataura is located in Azamgarh district of Uttar Pradesh. It is 40 km away from District head office. Its pin code is 276142 and its post office is Mangitpur. As per Census 2011 information the village code of Pratap Pur Chhataura village is 192003. The ambitious project of Gorakhpur Link Expressway Under UPIEDA is passing through the village.

Religion and castes 
There are two religions here i.e. Hindu and Muslim. Castes in the Hindu religion are Brahmin, Kshatriya, kurmi, nai, kumhar and sc.

Information 
Languages Spoken: Hindi, Urdu, Bhojpuri, Bihari

Time zone: IST (UTC+5:30)

Elevation / Altitude: 85 meters above Sea Level

Telephone Code / Std Code: 05462

More 
There is a primary school and junior high school in this village. There is also Panchayat Bhawan. A cottage is located in this village and religious show used to happen here, it also has pond there. There is now a huge idol of Lord Hanuman which is really amazing and people from nearby areas visit to see that idol.

Census data 
Pratap Pur Chhataura is a medium size village located in Burhanpur of Azamgarh district, Uttar Pradesh with total 106 families residing. The Pratap Pur Chhataura village has population of 702 of which 347 are males while 355 are females as per Population Census 2011. Sex ratio of village is 1023 women on 1000 men.

In Pratap Pur Chhataura village population of children with age 0-6 is 87 which makes up 12.39% of total population of village. Average Sex Ratio of Pratap Pur Chhataura village is 1023 which is higher than Uttar Pradesh state average of 912. Child Sex Ratio for the Pratap Pur Chhataura as per census is 706, lower than Uttar Pradesh average of 902.

Pratap Pur Chhataura village has higher literacy rate compared to Uttar Pradesh. In 2011, literacy rate of Pratap Pur Chhataura village was 75.61% compared to 67.68% of Uttar Pradesh. In Pratap Pur Chhataura Male literacy stands at 89.53% while female literacy rate was 62.70%.

As per constitution of India and Panchyati Raaj Act, Pratap Pur Chhataura village is administrated by Sarpanch (Head of Village), who is elected representative of village. Schedule Caste (SC) constitutes 14.39% of total population in Pratap Pur Chhataura village. The village Pratap Pur Chhataura currently does not have any Schedule Tribe (ST) population.

In Pratap Pur Chhataura village out of total population, 161 were engaged in work activities. 83.23% of workers describe their work as Main Work (Employment or Earning more than 6 Months) while 16.77% were involved in Marginal activity providing livelihood for less than 6 months. Of 161 workers engaged in Main Work, 57 were cultivators (owner or co-owner) while 58 were Agricultural labourer.

Occupation 
Occupation mainly depends upon agriculture and government sector jobs. There is also an active  Self-Help group led by Mrs Vandana Tiwari.  Few of them belongs to UPPCS, Teachers, Revenue Inspectors and Lekhpal, Engineering, Defence Ministry, Banking etc. The village is well known for producing high quality IITians and NITians .Some of them doing higher studies and research in respective fields.

Agriculture
As mentioned, agriculture is the backbone of this village. It produces a large amount of agricultural produce. Wheat, Rice, Sugarcane, Tobacco and vegetables are some mainly grown crops. Farmers use various modern day machines for ease of agriculture and sugarcane produce is the highest among all nearby villages

Nearby villages 
1-Pakhuadih achalipur 2. Ganga Pur Ratnawe 3. Kaitholia Mt Ratanawe 4. Rithiya 5. Usari 6. Jaddopur 7. Duraj Pur 8. Mangit Pur

References 

Villages in Azamgarh district